Greigite is an iron sulfide mineral with the chemical formula . It is the sulfur equivalent of the iron oxide magnetite (Fe3O4). It was first described in 1964 for an occurrence in San Bernardino County, California, and named after the mineralogist and physical chemist Joseph W. Greig (1895–1977).

Natural occurrence and composition
It occurs in lacustrine sediments with clays, silts and arkosic sand often in varved sulfide rich clays. It is also found in hydrothermal veins.  Greigite is formed by magnetotactic bacteria and sulfate-reducing bacteria. Greigite has also been identified in the sclerites of scaly-foot gastropods. 
  
The mineral typically appears as microscopic (< 0.03 mm) isometric hexoctahedral crystals and as minute sooty masses. Association minerals include montmorillonite, chlorite, calcite, colemanite, veatchite, sphalerite, pyrite, marcasite, galena and dolomite.

Common impurities include Cu, Ni, Zn, Mn, Cr, Sb and As. Ni impurities are of particular interest because the structural similarity between Ni-doped greigite and the  clusters present in biological enzymes has led to suggestions that greigite or similar minerals could have acted as catalysts for the origin of life. In particular, the cubic Fe4S4 unit of greigite is found in the Fe4S4 thiocubane units of proteins of relevance to the acetyl-CoA pathway.

Crystal structure
Greigite has the spinel structure. The crystallographic unit cell is cubic, with space group Fd3m. The S anions form a cubic close-packed lattice, and the Fe cations occupy both tetrahedral and octahedral sites.

Magnetic and electronic properties
Like the related oxide magnetite (Fe3O4), greigite is ferrimagnetic, with the spin magnetic moments of the Fe cations in the tetrahedral sites oriented in the opposite direction as those in the octahedral sites, and a net magnetization.  It is a mixed-valence compound, featuring both Fe(II) and Fe(III) centers in a 1:2 ratio. Both metal sites have high spin quantum numbers. The electronic structure of greigite is that of a half metal.

References

Thiospinel group
Iron(II,III) minerals
Ferromagnetic materials
Magnetic minerals
Cubic minerals
Minerals in space group 227